The Barsac Mission is a novel attributed to Jules Verne and written (with inspiration from two unfinished Verne manuscripts) by his son Michel Verne. First serialized in 1914, it was published in book form by Hachette in 1919. An English adaptation by I. O. Evans was published in 1960 in two volumes, Into the Niger Bend and The City in the Sahara. It includes a hidden city, called in English "Blackland", in the Sahara Desert.

Because of the interest of Jules Vernes in Esperanto, the original draft, by himself, called "Voyage d'étude", contained references to the language. When his son finished the work, he removed those references.

References

1914 French novels
1919 French novels
Novels by Jules Verne
Novels published posthumously
Novels first published in serial form
Novels set in Africa
Hachette (publisher) books
1914 science fiction novels